Nekrasovo is a rural locality (a village) in Kubenskoye Rural Settlement, Vologodsky District, Vologda Oblast, Russia. The population was 12 as of 2002.

Geography 
Nekrasovo is located 59 km northwest of Vologda (the district's administrative centre) by road. Dor is the nearest rural locality.

References 

Rural localities in Vologodsky District